Hamis Mwinjuma, also known as (MwanaFA) is a Tanzanian musician and politician.

He is a board member of the country's National Arts Council (BASATA), and a politician currently serving as a Member of Parliament representing Muheza constituency since November 2020. He was born in Muheza, Tanga Region.

In February 2023  MwanaFA was appointed by Tanzanian President Samia Suluhu Hassan As The Deputy Minister For Culture, Arts And Sports

References 

Living people
Year of birth missing (living people)
Tanzanian entertainers
People from Dar es Salaam
Tanzanian Muslims
Tanzanian MPs 2020–2025
21st-century Tanzanian politicians
Chama Cha Mapinduzi politicians
Chama Cha Mapinduzi MPs